The Idaho Building for the 1893 Chicago World's Fair was a rustic-design log construction designed by architect Kirtland Cutter. It was a popular favorite, visited by an estimated 18 million people.  The building's design and interior furnishings were a major precursor of the Arts and Crafts movement.  The structure stood on the extreme north line of Jackson Park, over a mile and a half from the Forestry Building, which it recalled.

Construction
It was built entirely of native materials consisting of a log house on a foundation or basement of lava and basaltic rock. The timbers were from young cedar trees, stuffed and stained to reproduce the effects of age.

The shakes on the roof were held in place with heavy rocks and withstood the great Chicago gales. The arched stone entrance seen in the picture opened into a large room, at the end of which was a stick fireplace with a log mantel. Stairways led to the second floor, where the windows were glazed with mica. This floor had divided accommodations for men and women. Each room was decorated with a view of recalling mining scenes to the experienced persons who should enter. The men's fireplace was made of lava rock, and the andirons were made of bear traps and fish spears, while arrows, spears, tomahawks, and other Native American implements were typified in the furniture.

It was later purchased to be used as a summer residence near a Northern resort.

See also
 Idaho Building at the Louisiana Purchase Exposition
 Idaho Building at the Lewis and Clark Centennial Exposition

References 

Furniture designs for the Idaho Building are archived at the  Idaho State Historical Society in Boise, Idaho.

Kirtland Cutter buildings
American Craftsman architecture in Illinois
Rustic architecture in Illinois
Former buildings and structures in Chicago
World's Columbian Exposition
World's fair architecture in Chicago
Idaho culture